Șirăuți is a village in Briceni District, Moldova.

Notable people
 Daniel Ciugureanu

References

Villages of Briceni District
Populated places on the Prut
Khotinsky Uyezd